Luis Manuel de los Santos Martinez (born December 29, 1966) is a former Major League Baseball first baseman. De los Santos played in the majors for parts of three seasons, including stints with the Kansas City Royals (-) and the Detroit Tigers. Afterwards, de los Santos played professionally in several countries, including Mexico, Taiwan, Japan, and South Korea.

Following his major league career, de Los Santos played two seasons for Charros de Jalisco of the Mexican League, in 1991 and 1992. After spending a year in Triple-A Edmonton that did not see him get called up to the majors, de los Santos played in three seasons with the Brother Elephants between 1994 and 1996, which saw him lead the Chinese Professional Baseball League in RBI in 1995.

De los Santos played for the Yomiuri Giants of Nippon Professional Baseball in 1997.

Following his stint in Japan and a two-season hiatus from baseball, de los Santos played a year for Saraperos de Saltillo and a year for the KBO's Kia Tigers before playing 50 games for the then Baltimore Orioles' Triple-A affiliate, the Rochester Red Wings, in 2002.

Afterward, de los Santos would sign with Gary Southshore Railcats of the independent Northern League, and in 2003, played for Nettuno Baseball Club in the Italian Baseball League.

External links

Career statistics and player information from Korea Baseball Organization

1966 births
American Association (1902–1997) MVP Award winners
Brother Elephants players
Caffe Danesi Nettuno players
Charros de Jalisco players
Detroit Tigers players
Diablos Rojos del México players
Dominican Republic expatriate baseball players in Canada
Dominican Republic expatriate baseball players in Italy
Dominican Republic expatriate baseball players in Japan
Dominican Republic expatriate baseball players in Mexico
Dominican Republic expatriate baseball players in South Korea
Dominican Republic expatriate baseball players in Taiwan
Dominican Republic expatriate baseball players in the United States
Edmonton Trappers players
Eugene Emeralds players
Fort Myers Royals players
Guerreros de Oaxaca players
Kansas City Royals players
KBO League infielders
Kia Tigers players

Living people
Major League Baseball first basemen
Major League Baseball players from the Dominican Republic
Memphis Chicks players
Mexican League baseball first basemen
Mexican League baseball third basemen
Nippon Professional Baseball third basemen
Omaha Royals players
Rochester Red Wings players
Toledo Mud Hens players
Yomiuri Giants players
Newtown High School alumni